Lanakila Baptist School is a college-preparatory K-12 private school located in Honolulu County, Hawaii. It serves grades sixth through twelve and has a current enrollment of about 70 students. The student population is ethnically diverse and includes Filipinos, Caucasians, part-Hawaiians, Japanese, Hispanics, Indo-Chinese, Chinese, Samoans, and African-Americans.

It is an educational ministry of and subservient to Lanakila Baptist Church of Waipahu.

History

In 1967, under the leadership of Rev. Robert K. Knutson, Lanakila Baptist Church assumed non-profit corporation status with a board of trustees. The church began its ministry by starting a preschool on the Waipahu campus in August 1969. This ministry was discontinued after one year in favor of beginning a K-12 academic ministry. From 1970–1975, Lanakila Baptist School was "grown" into a full Primary and Secondary school, graduating its first Senior class of four in June 1975. Since that time, Lanakila has graduated hundreds of students who have gone on to military service, colleges, technical schools, and a variety of other careers.

In order to accommodate continued growth of the Christian school, in the spring of 1979, Lanakila entered into a long-term lease agreement with Campbell Estate for property located at 91-1219 Renton Road in 'Ewa. This lease has subsequently changed lessor hands from Campbell Estate to the City and County of Honolulu, but remains in effect until July 2047. In the fall of 1979, the junior and senior high school division finally had its own campus and opened its doors in 'Ewa Beach.

The school belongs to the Association of Christian Schools International and is a Licensed Member of the Hawaii Association of Independent Schools.

Campus
The school is a historical site, housed in the offices of the old 'Ewa sugarcane plantation.

Academics
High school students have the choice of college preparatory and general education curricula. Most of the curriculum is provided by A Beka Book, with the exception of math, which is provided by Saxon math. The course schedule consists of six main periods for Monday, Tuesday, Thursday, and Friday; each being about 53 minutes long.

In 2015, the school began integrating technology by using G Suite, then called Google Apps for Education. In 2016, LBHS further integrating by technology by introducing ebooks as a better alternative to hardback books—with the exception of books that require writing, like English and foreign language books. The school also introduced Chromebooks to be a crucial part of the classroom—in note-taking, with ebooks, writing compositions, and to use G Suite.

Graduation Requirements
A minimum of 26 high school credits is required for Graduation.  1 credit is equivalent to one year or two semesters.  Half-credits are given for Wednesday electives and semester courses.

Wednesday Electives
On Wednesday, the school offers two periods for electives and a study hall. Each elective is about 1 hour and 45 minutes long.
Art 1A - Appreciation
Art 1B - Techniques
Choir
Film Appreciation
Intro Keyboarding (Typing)
Journalism
Judo
Ministries
Praise Band
Publications (Yearbook)
SAT Prep
Speech
Strings/Violin

Publications
There are two publications from Lanakila Baptist High School provided by both the Journalism & Publications classes:
Ka Nū Hou Maikaʻi
 The school newsletter, which means The Good News
Published quarterly
Kalama
The school Yearbook, which means The Torch
Published annually

Extracurricular activities

Clubs & Organizations
National Honor Society (NHS) & National Junior Honor Society (NJHS)- Kalama Chapter
Minimum GPA of 3.5
National Association of Student Councils (NASC)
Both School & Class Councils
Runs "The Oasis," a food & drink store in the school

Traditional Events
Carnival
Food Drive
Homecoming
Shirota Golf Tournament
Dedicated to John Shirota, who served as a principal for LBHS from 1991–2001.
Spirit Week
Spiritual Emphasis Week (bi-annual)
Spring Banquet

Athletics
Lanakila Baptist School belongs to the Interscholastic League of Honolulu. The Warriors compete in Interscholastic League of Honolulu competition. These sports include:
Basketball
Cross Country 
Track and Field
Volleyball

Lanakila Baptist athletes also compete in the league's Pac-Five team. These sports include:
Baseball
Cheerleading
Football
Judo
Paddling
Soccer
Softball
Water Polo
Wrestling

The school also has their own Cheerleading team, which participates in Basketball games.

Distinctions
In 2016, Ka Nū Hou Maikaʻi won 2nd Place in the Private School division for Best Comic Strip.

References

External links

Lanakila Baptist School building photo on Flickr
 Ka Nū Hou Maikaʻi publications on issuu

Educational institutions established in 1969
Private K-12 schools in Honolulu County, Hawaii
1969 establishments in Hawaii